Crimes and Misdemeanors is a 1989 American existential comedy-drama film written and directed by Woody Allen, who stars alongside Martin Landau, Mia Farrow, Anjelica Huston, Jerry Orbach, Alan Alda, Sam Waterston, and Joanna Gleason.

The film was met with critical acclaim, receiving three Academy Award nominations: Allen, for Best Director and Best Original Screenplay, and Landau, for Best Actor in a Supporting Role. Several publications have ranked Crimes and Misdemeanors as one of Allen's greatest films.

Plot
The story follows two main characters: Judah Rosenthal, a successful and reputable ophthalmologist, and Clifford Stern, a small-time documentary filmmaker.

Judah, an upper-class respected family man, is having an affair with flight attendant Dolores Paley. After it becomes clear to her that Judah will not end his marriage, Dolores threatens to disclose the affair to Judah's wife, Miriam. She is also aware of some questionable financial deals Judah made before becoming a wealthy ophthalmologist, which adds to his stress. He confides in a patient, Ben, a rabbi who is rapidly losing his eyesight. Ben advises openness and honesty between Judah and his wife, but Judah does not wish to imperil his marriage. Desperate, Judah turns to his brother, Jack, a gangster, who hires a hitman to kill Dolores. Before her corpse is discovered, Judah retrieves letters and other items from her apartment in order to cover his tracks. Stricken with guilt, Judah turns to the religious teachings he had rejected, believing for the first time that a just God is watching him and passing judgment.

Cliff, meanwhile, has been hired by his pompous brother-in-law, Lester, a successful television producer, to make a documentary celebrating Lester's life and work. Cliff grows to despise him. While filming and mocking the subject, Cliff falls in love with Lester's associate producer, Halley Reed. Despondent over his failing marriage to Lester's sister Wendy, he woos Halley, showing her footage from his ongoing documentary about Professor Louis Levy, a renowned philosopher. He ensures Halley is aware that he is shooting Lester's documentary merely for the money so he can finish his more meaningful project with Levy.

Cliff learns that Professor Levy, whom he had been profiling for a documentary centered on his philosophical views and the strength of his celebration of life, has committed suicide, leaving a curt note that only says: "I've gone out the window". When Halley visits to comfort him, he makes a pass at her, which she gently rebuffs, telling him she is not ready for another romance. Cliff's dislike for Lester becomes evident during the first screening of the film. Cliff has maliciously edited the film, which juxtaposes footage of Lester with clownish poses of Benito Mussolini addressing a throng of supporters from a balcony. It also shows Lester yelling at his employees and clumsily making a pass at an attractive young actress. Lester fires him.

Adding to Cliff's burdens, Halley leaves for London, where Lester is offering her a producing job; when she returns several months later, Cliff is astounded to discover that she and Lester are engaged. Hearing that Lester sent Halley white roses "round the clock, for days" while they were in London, Cliff is crestfallen as Halley falling for Lester is his “worst fear realized.” His last romantic gesture to Halley had been a love letter which he had mostly plagiarized from James Joyce including references to Dublin.

Judah and Cliff meet by happenstance at the wedding of the daughter of Rabbi Ben, who is Cliff's brother-in-law and Judah's patient. Judah has worked through his guilt and is enjoying life once more; the murder had been blamed on a drifter with a criminal record. He draws Cliff into a supposedly hypothetical discussion that draws upon his moral quandary. Judah says that with time, any crisis will pass; but Cliff morosely claims that “very few guys could live with that on their conscience.”. Judah cheerfully leaves the wedding party with his wife, and Cliff is left sitting alone, dejected.

The wedding party continues. Rabbi Ben, who is now blind, shares a dance with his daughter while the voice of Professor Levy is heard, saying that the universe is a dark and indifferent place which human beings fill with love, in the hope that “future generations will understand more.”

Cast

Production
After viewing the first cut of the film, Allen decided to throw out the first act, call back actors for reshoots, and focus on what turned out to be the central story.

Music
Allen makes use of classical and jazz music in many of the film's scenes. The soundtrack includes Franz Schubert's String Quartet No. 15 (a recording by the Juilliard String Quartet), which is used in the scenes leading up to Dolores' death, and Judah discovering her body.

Influences
The outline of Judah's moral dilemma—whether a person can continue everyday life with the knowledge of having committed murder—evokes the pivotal idea of Russian novelist Fyodor Dostoyevsky's Crime and Punishment (1866), despite suggesting a resolution nearly opposite to that of the novel. Allen would revisit the theme in his films Match Point, Cassandra's Dream, and Irrational Man.

Soundtrack

Rosalie (1937) – Written by Cole Porter – Performed by The Jazz Band
Excerpt from the Soundtrack of 'Mr. & Mrs. Smith' (1941) – Music by Edward Ward
Dancing on the Ceiling (1930) – Music by Richard Rodgers – Performed by Bernie Leighton
Taking a Chance on Love (1940) – Music by Vernon Duke – Lyrics by John La Touche 
I Know That You Know (1926) – Music by Vincent Youmans – Lyrics by Anne Caldwell
English Suite No. 2 in A minor (1722) – Music by Johann Sebastian Bach – Performed by Alicia de Larrocha 
Home Cooking – Written by Hilton Ruiz – Performed by The Hilton Ruiz Quartet
Happy Birthday to You (1893) – Written by Mildred J. Hill & Patty S. Hill
Sweet Georgia Brown (1925) – Music by Ben Bernie & Maceo Pinkard – Lyrics by Kenneth Casey
I've Got You (1942) – Music by Jacques Press – Lyrics by Frank Loesser
This Year's Kisses (1937) – Written by Irving Berlin – Performed by Ozzie Nelson 
All I Do Is Dream of You (1934) – Music by Nacio Herb Brown – Lyrics by Arthur Freed
String Quartet in G major, Op. 161, D.887, 1st movement(1826) – Music by Franz Schubert – Performed by the Juilliard String Quartet
Murder He Says (1942) – Music by Jimmy McHugh – Lyrics by Frank Loesser
Beautiful Love (1931) – Music by Victor Young, Wayne King and Egbert Van Alstyne – Lyrics by Haven Gillespie
Great Day (1929) – Music by Vincent Youmans – Lyrics by Billy Rose & Edward Eliscu
Star Eyes (1943) – Music by Gene de Paul – Lyrics by Don Raye – Performed by Lee Musiker
Because (1902) – Music by Guy d'Hardelot – Lyrics by Edward Teschemacher
Crazy Rhythm (1928) – Music by Roger Wolfe Kahn & Joseph Meyer – Lyrics by Irving Caesar
I'll See You Again (1929) – Written by Noël Coward
Cuban Mambo (1958) – Music by Xavier Cugat & Rafael Angulo – Lyrics by Jack Wiseman
Polkadots and Moonbeams (1939) – Music by Jimmy Van Heusen – Lyrics by Johnny Burke
I'll Be Seeing You (1938) – Music by Sammy Fain – Lyrics by Irving Kahal – Performed by Liberace

Reception

Box office
The film grossed a domestic total of $18,254,702.

Critical response
Crimes and Misdemeanors received mostly positive reviews. It holds a 92% "Certified Fresh" rating on review aggregator Rotten Tomatoes, based on 50 critics, with an average rating of 7.9/10. It holds a 77/100 weighted average score on Metacritic, based on 10 critics, indicating "generally favorable reviews".

Vincent Canby of The New York Times lauded the film, remarking:

Roger Ebert of the Chicago Sun-Times gave the film four out of four stars, writing:

Though normally a fierce critic of Allen's work, John Simon of National Review declared the film to be "Allen's first successful blending of drama and comedy, plot and subplot," and also wrote:  Variety gave the film a more mixed review, however, writing, "Woody Allen ambitiously mixes his two favoured strains of cinema, melodrama and comedy, with mixed results in Crimes and Misdemeanours."

Accolades
The film was met with critical acclaim, and was nominated for three Academy Awards: Allen for Best Director and Best Original Screenplay, and Martin Landau for Best Actor in a Supporting Role.

In Empire magazine's 2008 poll of "The 500 Greatest Movies of All Time", Crimes and Misdemeanors was ranked number 267. In 2010, it was the first film to win the 20/20 Award for Best Picture, Best Original Screenplay (Allen), and Best Supporting Actor (Landau). It also received three additional nominations, for Best Director (Woody Allen), Best Supporting Actor (Jerry Orbach) and Best Supporting Actress (Huston). In a 2016 Time Out contributors' poll, it ranked second only to Annie Hall among Allen's efforts, with Dave Calhoun praising it as "the film in which Woody's comic and serious sides most comfortably align". The film achieved the same rank in a 2016 article by The Daily Telegraph critics Robbie Collin and Tim Robey, who wrote, "Here [Allen is] thinking deeply about moral choice, the question of whether guilt in your own eyes or the eyes of the world matters more. This bubblingly wise film, rich with beautifully dovetailing metaphors about blindness and conscience and the perils of self-knowledge, [...] is Allen on soaring form, gliding so elegantly through its maze of ideas it's as if the spirit of Fred Astaire gave it lift-off." Crimes and Misdemeanors was also named Allen's second best by Chris Nashawaty of Entertainment Weekly and Barbara VanDenbergh of The Arizona Republic, third by Darian Lusk of CBS News, and fourth by Zachary Wigon of Nerve. In a 2015 BBC critics' poll, it was voted the 57th greatest American film ever made.

In October 2013, the film was voted by The Guardian readers as the third best film directed by Allen.

Release

Home media
Crimes and Misdemeanors was released through MGM Home Entertainment on DVD on June 5, 2001. A limited-edition Blu-ray of 3,000 units was later released by Twilight Time on February 11, 2014.

Further reading

References

External links

 
 
 
 

1989 films
1989 comedy-drama films
1989 independent films
1980s American films
1980s English-language films
1980s satirical films
American comedy-drama films
American independent films
American satirical films
Anthony Award-winning works
Films about adultery in the United States
Films about film directors and producers
Films about Jews and Judaism
Films directed by Woody Allen
Films produced by Robert Greenhut
Films set in Manhattan
Films shot in New Jersey
Films shot in New York City
Films with screenplays by Woody Allen
Orion Pictures films
Uxoricide in fiction